The Edward M. Gregg Farm is a historic farm located near Jerome, Idaho. The property includes a farmhouse, bunk house, well house, barn, and chicken house. The buildings were built with lava rock, a popular building material in south central Idaho in the late nineteenth and early twentieth centuries. The one-story house was built in 1914 for Edward M. Gregg, and the remaining buildings were added over the next two decades. The early 1930s well house was designed by local stonemason H.T. Pugh.

The farm was listed on the National Register of Historic Places on September 8, 1983.

See also
 Historic preservation
 History of agriculture in the United States
 National Register of Historic Places listings in Jerome County, Idaho

References

External links 
 * 

1914 establishments in Idaho
Buildings and structures in Jerome County, Idaho
Farms on the National Register of Historic Places in Idaho
Houses completed in 1914
National Register of Historic Places in Jerome County, Idaho